Eastmead  may refer to:

William Eastmead
Eastmead, Swindon, England
Eastmead, Pretoria, South Africa